Lavale may refer to:

 Lavale, Pune in Maharashtra, India
 Lavale Thomas (born 1963), American football running back 
Russ Lavale (born 1974), Australian Olympic table tennis player
 Los Angeles Vale F.C.